The 1977 Campeonato Nacional de Fútbol Profesional was first tier's 45th season. Unión Española was the tournament's champion, winning its fifth title.

Standings

Scores

Relegation playoff

Deportes Ovalle relegated to Segunda División

Topscorer

Liguilla Pre-Copa Libertadores

Promotion/relegation Liguilla

See also 
 1977 Copa Chile

References

External links 
ANFP 
RSSSF Chile 1977

Primera División de Chile seasons
Chile
Prim